Sumgayit State Musical Drama Theater is a professional theater operating in Sumgayit, Azerbaijan. It is named after Huseyn Arablinski.

History

The Sumgayit State Drama Theater, named after the Azerbaijani theater figure and director Huseyn Arablinski, was created in September 1968. In 1969, the Azerbaijani government made a decision to perpetuate the memory of Huseyn Arablinski by naming the theater after him. This was enacted as a decision of the Cabinet of Ministers of Azerbaijan SSR and by the order of the Ministry of Culture.

The theater opened its curtain on March 14, 1969 with Mirza Fatali Akhundzadeh's "Monsieur Jordan, the Botanist, and Dervish Mastali-shah", directed by Jannat Salimova. On the following day, the British poet John Patrick's work was performed, produced by Nasir Sadigzade. 
In 1974 the theater was given the status of "Sumgayit State Drama Theater" by the decision of the Ministry of Culture.

Repertoire
The repertoire of the theater includes the plays of classic and contemporary Azerbaijani, Russian and foreign playwrights.

References

Theatres in Azerbaijan
Arts organizations established in 1968